Diaschisis (from Greek διάσχισις meaning "shocked throughout") is a sudden change of function in a portion of the brain connected to a distant, but damaged, brain area. The site of the originally damaged area and of the diaschisis are connected to each other by neurons. The loss of the damaged structure disrupts the function of the remaining intact systems and causes a physiological imbalance. This can lead both to restitution as well as disruption of distal brain areas. The injury is produced by an acute focal disturbance in an area of the brain, from traumatic brain injury or stroke, for example. Regarding dysfunctional diaschisis, some function may be restored with gradual readjustment of the intact but suppressed areas through intervention and the brain's natural neuroplasticity.

The term diaschisis was coined by Constantin von Monakow in 1914. Von Monakow's concept of neurophysical changes in distant brain tissue to the focal lesion led to a widespread clinical interest. Doctors were interested in how diaschisis could describe the signs and symptoms of brain lesions that could not be explained.

The areas of the brain are connected by vast organized neuronal pathways that allow one area of the brain to influence other areas more distal to it. Understanding these dense pathways helps to link a lesion causing brain damage in one area of the brain to degeneration in a more distal brain area. A focal lesion causes damage that also disturbs the structural and functional connectivity to the brain areas distal to the lesion.

The primary mechanism of diaschisis is functional deafferentation, which is the loss of the input of information from the part of the brain that is now damaged. The decrease in information and neural firing to the distal brain area causes those synaptic connections to weaken and initiates a change in the structural and functional connectivity around that area. This leads to diaschisis. Diaschisis is also influenced by many other factors, including stroke, brain swelling, and neuroanatomical disconnection. The severity of these factors is manifested in altered neuronal excitability, hypo-metabolism, and hypo perfusion.

Currently the term diaschisis has a more positive connotation, describing the period of rapid recovery of function immediately following brain insult. Diaschisis is an especially important recovery factor in children with insults, as child brains are more susceptible to neurodegerative processes. This is due to differences in myelination and water content, which allow a diffuse transmition of traumatic forces.

There are two types of diaschisis. The first is focal diaschisis, which refers to the remote neurophysiological changes that are caused by a focal lesion based on von Monakow's definition. The second type of diaschisis is non-focal diaschisis and it focuses on the changes in the strength and direction of neural pathways and connectivity between brain areas. This type of diaschisis has only been a topic in recent studies as a result of the advancement of brain imaging tools and technology. These new tools allow for better understanding of the organization of the brain connectivity and further investigation into new types of diaschisis, like non-focal or connectional diaschisis. This new type of diaschisis relates much more closely to clinical findings.

References

External links 

Neurotrauma